Governor Long may refer to:

Earl Long (1895–1960), 45th Governor of Louisiana, brother of Huey Long
Huey Long (1893–1935), 40th Governor of Louisiana
John Davis Long (1838–1915), 32nd Governor of Massachusetts
Oren E. Long (1889–1965), Territorial Governor of Hawaii, 1951 to 1953